Dergaon (IPA: ˈdɜːˌgɑ̃ʊ) is a town and a municipality in the Golaghat district of Assam, India.It is 282 km from the state capital Guwahati.

Hemchandra Barua, the compiler of Hemkosh (the earliest Assamese-English dictionary) was from Dergaon.

History
Dergoan also known as Devargoan which implies the village of god Shiva. This area was captured from the Kacharis during the reign of Suhungmung. It has the famous Negheriting Shiva Doul constructed by Swargadeo Rajeswar Singha In 1765.

Ahoms kings had established here a royal station (Rajabahor), a Pilkhana (centre of elephant training) and a dockyard called Negeri Noasali.

Geography
It has an average elevation of 82 metres (269 feet).

Demographics
 India census, Dergaon had a population of 13,364. Males constitute 56% of the population and females 44%. Dergaon has an average literacy rate of 85%, higher than the national average of 59.5%: male literacy is 88% and, female literacy is 81%. In Dergaon, 10% of the population is under 6 years of age.

Politics
Dergaon is part of Kaliabor (Lok Sabha constituency).
Dergaon (Vidhan Sabha constituency) is a constituency in the 126 member Assam Legislative Assembly. It is reserved for Scheduled Caste candidates. The present MLA is Bhabendra Nath Bharali of Asom Gana Parishad (AGP) preceded by Smti. Arati Hazarika Kachari of Indian National Congress.

Transport
Dergaon is very well connected by roadways to all the places of Assam. The National Highway 37 passes through Dergaon. Barua Bamun Gaon (BBGN) railway station is the closest railway station of Dergaon. The nearest airport is Rowriah Airport which is at Jorhat town.

Education
Dergaon Kamal Dowerah College (DKD College)  (website),
Police Training College  (website) and
Dergaon Higher Secondary School are some of the oldest educational institutions in Dergaon. Started in 1908, Dergaon Higher Secondary School has recently observed its 100's anniversary.
Besides these, the Girls' H.S. School, Indrani Devi High School and Shishu Bharati High School has also given much importance on the all-round development of the students of this town. Don Bosco High School, established in 1995, a prominent English medium school of the town, had the first result of HSLC in 2007. Shankardev Shishu Niketan, Dergaon, pioneer in Assamese medium for private sector schools, is also significant for its good education, brilliant results and co-curricular activities. Apart from this Shankardev Sishu Niketan Kakodonga, located in Majukuchi gaon and established in the year 2001 is also considered as a very good high school in dergaon producing notable results in the last years. There are a number of private junior colleges and schools in Dergaon, among these Radiant College, Udayan Academy, Alpine English School, Maria Nivas School are some of the well known private institutions in the town.

Notable people
Chandradhar Barua, Assamese eminent writer, poet, dramatist
Nilmani Phookan Jr, Assamese poet and academic

References

Cities and towns in Golaghat district
Golaghat district